Lambiella aliphatica is a species of crustose lichen in the family Xylographaceae. Found in Alaska, it was described as a new species in 2020 by Toby Spribille and Philipp Resl. The type specimen was collected in the Hoonah-Angoon Census Area of Glacier Bay National Park. Here it was found at an altitude of  growing on an argillite rock in alpine scree. The specific epithet aliphatica refers to the unidentified fatty acids  that are present in the thallus. It is the first member of genus Lambiella to contain primarily fatty acids in the thallus. Lambiella globulosa is similar in morphology, but this species contains stictic acid rather than fatty acids as the primary secondary metabolite.

References

Baeomycetales
Lichen species
Lichens described in 2020
Lichens of Subarctic America
Taxa named by Toby Spribille
Fungi without expected TNC conservation status